Savva Vasilyevich Morozov (24 April 1770 – 1860) was an eighteenth-century Russian entrepreneur, who founded the Morozov dynasty.

Origins
He was born a serf, his father, a fisherman having been sold by Vsevoloshsky along with other serfs, building and structures as part of the village of Zuevo to a collegiate counsellor called Ryumin. But when he was twenty years old, Savva was not content with the life of a peasant. He worked in a textile factory belonging to Fedor Kononov, who lent him 1,500 roubles to buy himself out of compulsory military service. He then married Ulyana, who shared with him her families secret method of dying fabric, and Savva was able to repay his debt in two years.

Morozov benefitted from the shortage of textiles in the Russian Empire following the destruction of the textile industry around Moscow by Napoleon.

Business activities

Innovations
Morozov was the first entrepreneur to import textile machinery from England. He imported machines from Hick, Hargreaves & Co and Platt Brothers. These were acquired through De Jersey & Co., for whom Ludwig Knoop worked.

Family
He married Afanasyevna, the daughter of a local dye-master, with whom he had six children  were:
 1798: Elisei Savvich Morozov
 1802: Zhakar Savvich Morozov
 1806: Abram Savvich Morozov
 1810: Ivan Savvich Morozov
 1812: Varvara Savvichna Morozova
 1823: Timofei Savvich Morozov

References

1770 births
1860 deaths
Old Believers
Businesspeople from the Russian Empire